Anomis erosa, the yellow scallop moth or abutilon moth, is a moth of the family Erebidae. The species was first described by Jacob Hübner in 1821. It is found in south-eastern North America. It is mostly a southern species, but migrants reach Manitoba, Quebec and Maine.

The wingspan is about 27 mm.

The larvae feed on cotton, Hibiscus or rose of Sharon, hollyhock, marsh mallow, okra, rose-mallow, velvet leaf and other Malvaceae species.

References

External links

Moths of Maryland
Lepiforum e. V.

Catocalinae
Moths of North America
Taxa named by Jacob Hübner
Moths described in 1821